Benedetto Buglioni (1459/1460–1521) was an Italian Renaissance sculptor. 

Buglioni was born in Florence, son of another sculptor Giovanni di Bernardo. In the early 1480s Buglioni and his brother opened their own studio, and jointly worked on a number of commissions for various churches in the area. This includes works for the Church of Ognissanti, the church of San Pietro in Radicofani, and the Church of Santa Lucia a Settimello in Calenzano. 

Buglioni specialized in glazed terracotta works. Some of his other works reside at the Cleveland Museum of Art. Buglioni died in Florence in 1521.

See also
 Santi Buglioni, nephew and collaborator of Benedetto Buglioni

References

External links
European sculpture and metalwork, a collection catalog from The Metropolitan Museum of Art Libraries (fully available online as PDF), which contains material on Buglioni (see index)

1459 births
1521 deaths
Sculptors from Florence
15th-century Italian sculptors
Italian male sculptors
16th-century Italian sculptors
Italian Renaissance sculptors